Oliver Footwear is an Australian footwear manufacturing company, but their boots are made off shore. Oliver specialises in lightweight work boots. Oliver Work Boots originated in Ballarat Vic Australia in 1887 originally supplying boots for gold miners in the area.

In 2011 they were purchased by Kings Safety in Asia and in 2012 both the Kings and Oliver work boot brands were purchased by American company Honeywell to complement their safety PPE portfolio , since then the Oliver Work Boot Brand is sold worldwide wide including USA , NZ , Asia and UAE.

The Oliver brand can be found at most work wear stores including Blackwoods , Totally Work Wear, Hip Pocket Workwear and Safety Quip stores.

In Australia and New Zealand Oliver still employs a team of Sales Managers , Product Development, Testing and Compliance and Marketing staff.

The Oliver Footwear brand is sold predominantly to Mining , Oil and Gas, construction , warehousing and government markets.

See also

List of oldest companies in Australia

References

External links

Shoe companies of Australia
Companies based in Victoria (Australia)
Clothing companies established in 1887
Australian companies established in 1887
Workwear
Ballarat